The basketball tournament at the 1967 Mediterranean Games was held in Tunis, Tunisia.

Medalists

References
1967 Mediterranean Games report at the International Committee of Mediterranean Games (CIJM) website
List of Olympians who won medals at the Mediterranean Games at Olympedia.org

Basketball
Basketball at the Mediterranean Games
International basketball competitions hosted by Tunisia
1967–68 in European basketball
1967 in Asian basketball
1967 in African basketball